Black Lightning is an American superhero television series developed by Salim Akil, airing on The CW. It is based on the DC Comics character of the same name, created by Tony Isabella. It stars Cress Williams as the titular character alongside China Anne McClain, Nafessa Williams, Christine Adams, Marvin Jones III, Damon Gupton, James Remar, Chantal Thuy, and Jordan Calloway. Initially set on an unnamed alternative Earth separate from the other Arrowverse media, the show was later merged with Earth-1 (the setting of Arrow, The Flash, Legends of Tomorrow, and Batwoman) and Earth-38 (the setting of Supergirl) into Earth-Prime during Crisis on Infinite Earths.
 
The series sees the retired Black Lightning (Cress Williams), who as Jefferson Pierce is a high school principal and loving father, return to the hero life after his daughters are kidnapped by the 100 Gang, which is later revealed to be led by Tobias Whale (Marvin Jones III), who apparently killed Jefferson's father years before the onset.
 
Jefferson's elder daughter Anissa (who is an avid social activist for African-American human rights) later discovers she has inherited her father's metahuman genes, although she is initially unaware that he is Black Lightning and begins investigating her grandfather's articles concerning a group of young metahumans who disappeared years ago. She later discovers her father is Black Lightning and joins him using her powers as a vigilante. Jefferson's ex-wife Lynn Stewart (Christine Adams), is the main inspiration of Jefferson's initial retirement as she feared him dying on the streets, but she begrudgingly realizes she cannot stop him after discovering Anissa's abilities even when Jennifer develops abilities of her own.

Overview
Legend
 = Main cast (credited)
 = Recurring cast (4+ episodes)
 = Guest cast (1–3 episodes)

Main characters

Jefferson Pierce / Black Lightning

Jefferson "Jeff" Pierce (portrayed by Cress Williams as an adult; seasons 1-4; Kaden Washington Smith as a child) is the main protagonist of the series.
 
At the beginning of season one, Jefferson has retired crime-fighting as Black Lightning due to the urges of his ex-wife Lynn and the safety of his two daughters and is the benevolent school principal of Garfield High who is loved by his students and his daughters. His foster father, Peter Gambi, urges him to return to the streets and use his metahuman abilities to give hope to the inhabitants of Freeland, their city, which is under duress by the 100 Street Gang. Jefferson adamantly refuses to return and resists using his powers even against a group of racists police officers who pull him and his daughters over unjustified suspicions, but after his daughter Jennifer is captured by the 100 (and later his other daughter Anissa), he uses his metahuman abilities (which allow him to generate and control electricity offensively) to fight off the gangsters holding them captive as Black Lightning, adorning a new suit built for him by Gambi (although, he initially only does this as a once-off for his daughters).

Initially, Jefferson only returns to being Black Lightning to save his daughters and promises his ex-wife Lynn that it was a never to be repeated occasion and Black Lightning is gone and the two begin to explore reuniting, with Jefferson believing he can do more as Jefferson than Black Lightning could ever do as the community believes in his ability to get things done as a school principal and elder. As the series progresses, it revealed that Jefferson's ability to stand up for the community is so effective that he has come to be affectionately known as "Black Jesus" as revealed by his former student LaWanda White. Members of Freeland's community complain to Jefferson about the looming threat of the 100 taking young girls, including LaWanda's own daughter and having them forcibly work for them, but Jefferson continues to resist Black Lightning and promises to help find another way. He speaks to Latavius (who insists to be called "Lala"), one of Jeff's former students and a high-ranking member of the 100 gang, and asks him to back off to no avail, forcing LaWanda to confront Lala only for him to shoot and instantly kill her. Unbeknown to Latavius, she has recorded the event and it is found by the police, who use this as evidence to imprison Latavius. LaWanda's death forms the catalyst to convince Jeff that he is not doing better as Jefferson Pierce but must fully return and act as Black Lightning, much to Lynn's chagrin. As Black Lightning once more, Jeff attacks and hands Lala over to the police, who apprehend him, although is soon murdered by Tobias Whale, the secret true leader of the 100 gang.
 
Jeff continues to act as Black Lightning during the night and principal and parent during the day, dealing with the stress of Jennifer's adolescence and Anissa's incessant cry for action against the 100. Gambi helps him by watching through a camera in his glasses and a com and has surveillance watching most parts of the city. It is later revealed that Jefferson's father was a journalist who was killed by Tobias after he wrote an article about him. Jefferson retired shortly after a confrontation with Tobias that left the gangster believing he'd killed Black Lightning, making a name for himself on the streets for the past decade. Upon discovering he is alive, Tobias attempts to have Black Lightning killed while citizens of Freeland pay tribute to his return, but the bullet instead hits Jennifer's boyfriend Khalil, severing his spinal cord and crippling the track star. After discovering Tobias's resurgence, Jefferson attempts to kill him to avenge his father, but is convinced he's better by Lynn, who reminds him he is a hero and not a murderer shortly before she is attacked by some 100 gangsters for biological research into the drug Greenlight (a high addictive drug which the 100 had begun selling to the youth that seems to temporarily give them enhanced strength while under its frenzy). The gangsters are chased off by Anissa, who is revealed to have inherited her father's metahuman genes, has powers and has started to act as a vigilante as well. Upon arrival, Black Lightning fights a masked Anissa, believing her to be the one attacking a gagged and tied-up Lynn. After a heated confrontation, Jefferson knocks Anissa out only to realize who she is. Lynn laments that she is also a metahuman and that she has followed in Jeff's footsteps but the two are forced to accept her need to fight for good just like Black Lightning and Lynn has Gambi make her suit. Jefferson though is displeased with Lynn's apparent hypocrisy and briefly voices his outrage on the matter.

In season three, Agent Odell gives Jefferson a special watch. When this watch is charged to a specific point, Jefferson gains a new costume through nano-technology. This enabled Odell to win Black Lightning into assisting against the Markovian invaders. After returning to Garfield High, he learns from Principal Mike Lowry that the A.S.A. had him reassign Jefferson to the occupation of guidance counselor. Due to the A.S.A.'s oppression, Black Lightning starts to work alongside the rebels.

In part three of Crisis on Infinite Earths, he is recruited by the Flash and his team in an effort to stop an anti-matter wave from annihilating the entire multiverse after he was teleported away while his world was erased. In the final part, Jefferson is restored when his Earth is merged with Earth-1 and Earth-38 to form Earth-Prime. He later become the founding members of a "league of heroes" alongside Barry and several other heroes. Black Lightning returns to Freeland and continues assisting the resistance. When Lynn is taken to Markovia, Jefferson has a parley with Major Sara Grey when it comes to a plan for a rescue mission. Jefferson agrees to help the A.S.A. rescue Lynn under the condition that the metahumans that assist them are off limits afterwards. When it came to the raid on a Markovian facility, Jefferson came up with an idea to have Thunder strike Erica Moran until she has absorbed enough kinetic energy to break down the strong door. Despite being hit by a laser gun wielded by Gravedigger, Black Lightning catches up to the group and shocks Gravedigger into submission. Then he and Lynn retreat to Freeland. When the Markovians attack Freeland, Black Lightning assists in defeating the ones that were attacking the Perdi. Lynn later informs Jefferson that his DNA and Gravedigger's DNA are a match meaning that they are both related. When Gravedigger defeats Lightning, Black Lightning begins to fight him. After Black Lightning tries to reason with him while mentioning that they are related, Gravedigger uses a microwave move to cause some burns to Black Lightning. When some Markovian soldiers make off with Lightning, Black Lightning makes a tactical retreat. He receives help from Brandon to rescue Lightning. After Henderson dies in his arms after shooting the soldiers that were planning to attack him, Black Lightning fights Gravedigger in the Pit. With help from Lynn using an anti-boost serum on Gravedigger, Black Lightning defeats him and gets everybody out of the Pit before it self-destructs. Following Odell being wounded by Khalil, Black Lightning is accompanied by Lynn, Thunder, and Lightning where they present the briefcase to a congressional committee that exposes the A.S.A.'s experiments as well as Markovia's own experiments.

 Williams also portrays Jefferson of Earth-1, who became the Secretary of Education. He secretly helped Reverend Holt with the metahuman underground railroad before he was killed by the A.S.A. This version ceased to exist when Earth-Prime was formed.
 Williams also portrays Jefferson of Earth-2, who was killed by Jinn alongside the rest of his family when they tried to intervene after she ended the Markovian threat. This version ceased to exist when a new Earth-2 was formed.

Jennifer Pierce / Lightning

Jennifer "Jen" Pierce (portrayed by China Anne McClain as a teenager in season 1 to the first four episodes of season 4 and the series finale, Laura Kariuki for the remainder of season 4, Fallyn Brown as a child) is Jefferson Pierce's younger daughter and a metahuman, like her father and sister. She is based on the DC Comics character of the same name.
 
Jennifer is portrayed as a carefree, rebellious teenager who is prone to challenging the "good girl" appearance imposed on her by her respected father, who is the principal of her high school Garfield High, as well her sister Anissa, who is a teacher at the same school. Initially, Jennifer is very careless and even at times reckless with her own life such in the series premiere when getting drunk in a well-known 100 club and almost being forced to work for them. Jennifer is subsequently rescued by her father, who unbeknownst to her is the crime-fighting vigilante known as Black Lightning. After being kidnapped by the 100 with her sister Anissa, she is rescued by Black Lightning and begins drinking and smoking to mask her fear.

Jefferson has extensively taught Jennifer and Anissa martial arts and she is a very skilled hand-to-hand combatant, having once even efficiently broken a girl's wrist. She and her sister Anissa share a very close relationship, although Jennifer often does not support Anissa's more confrontational approach to doing the right thing. Jennifer begins to show maturity after her long-time friend Khalil (who is Garfield High's track star) asks her to be his girlfriend and becomes a stable influence on her life. Jennifer deeply cares for Khalil and after they agree to lose their virginity together, she is responsible enough to inform her parents she will be having sex, although Khalil is shot and crippled before this can happen while marching against the 100's gang violence with Jennifer, ending his ambitions of becoming an Olympic star and transcending the limitations usually imposed on teenagers of color (an example he makes is getting a girl pregnant, getting in jail or becoming a junkie). This puts a strain on their relationship and Khalil lashes out at Jennifer, on an occasion even supporting a girl cyberbullying her. After confronting him on the matter, Khalil reveals he blames her for his new status due to her encouraging him to join him on the march that got him shot, seemingly ending their relationship. Jennifer is currently unaware that she has also inherited her father's metahuman genes and that, like her sister, may one day gain her own abilities, a fact that is presently being kept from her by her sister, mother and father.

After she quits running track, Jennifer becomes an unpaid intern for her mother. Later, an encounter with her friend Kiesha startles Jennifer into awakening her own latent metahuman abilities, which become known to her after Kiesha almost falls off a ladder. Her abilities manifest as a very hot red lightning that comes from her hands and burns her smartphone. She keeps this a secret from Kiesha and later consciously attempts to recreate the earlier conditions and confirms she has abilities, further destroying her phone. Terrified, Jennifer immediately tells her sister and shows her the deconstructed smartphone.

The next morning, Anissa confesses the truth about her and their father being metahumans and that she is the crime fighting Thunder. As Jennifer initially does not believe her, Anissa uses her super strength to lift Jennifer's bed in a demonstration. Terrified, Jennifer flies and confronts their father, who begrudgingly admits Anissa is telling the truth. This makes Jennifer react angrily as she thinks they have all betrayed her trust as they have lied to her whole life. Later she laments to her mother that she will no longer have a happy and normal life and get to experience such things as prom, marriage and having children due to her new state as a "freak". She also confronts the fact that Lynn herself (who admits she is human and not Vixen or Supergirl as Jennifer suggested) ended her marriage to Jefferson because he was the metahuman Black Lightning. Jennifer and Anissa later reconcile and she shows her older sister her online presence and following far exceeds even Black Lightning's. Jefferson later talks to Jennifer and the two watch a movie together after Jennifer reveals they have not done so in some time. Jefferson also later assures her that the only life she will live is the one she wishes to live and that she does not have to become a superheroine like her sister or himself. This helps Jennifer although she still admits difficulty in accepting or even exploring her new abilities.

When Anissa tries to push her to find out what her abilities are and take up the mantle of becoming a hero, Jennifer's abilities manifest again and react violently due to the hurtful things Anissa said, having denounced Jennifer as a "disappointment". Her powers char a nearby couch and Anissa theorizes that her seemingly electric powers resemble their father's. Anissa has her sent to their mother's lab to take an MRI scan to insure Jennifer is okay. This leads to the discovery that Jennifer's cells are constantly producing "pure energy" in contrast to Jefferson's, whose electric powers are absorbed and conducted from an exterior source like a battery's while Jennifer's body acts as a powerful interior generator for a stronger kind of "lightning".

After the A.S.A. discovers Black Lightning's secret identity, Jennifer and her family are forced to go into hiding.

In season two, Jennifer starts to get control of her abilities. She manages to perfect them when she finally confronts Tobias Whale for what he did to Khalil and takes up the name of Lightning. Though Lightning chooses not to kill Tobias, she helps her father defeat him.

In season three, Jennifer works to gain control of her powers at the time when her parents are in A.S.A. custody. Odell uses her to destroy a Markovian facility that was cleared out by Black Lightning and the A.S.A. commandos that he rescued after Odell claimed to her that the Markovians killed Nichelle. She soon starts to do secret missions for Odell as she is also advised to pick a side when it becomes a three-way struggle between Freeland, the A.S.A., and the Markovians. After being exposed to the anti-matter in the sky in a lead-up to Crisis on Infinite Earths, Jennifer meets two of her doppelgangers in a void and learns the flaws of having too little power and too much power. As Gambi worked to stabilize Jennifer, her body turned into a light as the anti-matter wave erases her Earth. Following the Crisis, Jennifer pulls herself together and declares that she is done with Odell. When the A.S.A. arrive to rescue Odell, Jennifer is shocked to see Painkiller alive and knocks him out. Jennifer helps to form a firewall to trap the Painkiller program. When Khalil regains control of his body and learns what the A.S.A. did to it, Jennifer is told that they can't be together. Jennifer later assists in the plans to rescue her mother from the Markovians. She finds her mother who has turned the tide on Yuri Mosin and helps to evacuate her. Jennifer later helps Brandon get the information about Brandon's mother from Dr. Jace. When Gravedigger arrives in Freeland, Lightning takes out the Markovian soldiers with him before Gravedigger throws her into the perimeter enough for it to come down. Black Lightning rescues Lightning and resuscitates her as Gravedigger catches up to them. After being dragged off by Markovian soldiers, Lightning is kept their prisoner as she tries to reason with Gravedigger. She is rescued by Black Lightning and Brandon. When in the Pit, Lightning and Brandon do a combo attack on Gravedigger who knocks them down. Following the conflict in Freeland, Lightning accompanies Black Lightning, Lynn, and Thunder to a Congressional committee hearing where they present the briefcase that exposes the A.S.A.'s experiments as well as Markovia's own experiments.

In season four, Lightning assists Blackbird in fighting the 100 and the Kobra Cartel during their turf war. During a trip to the ionosphere, Lightning explodes causing Black Lightning to harness the energy particles so that Gambi's machine can put her back together. The process works, but Jennifer's appearance drastically changes. Because of this, Jennifer takes up the alias of J.J. Stewart who is Jefferson's niece from Lynn's side of the family. Lynn later finds out that Jennifer's new form is starting to become unstable. Jennifer later re-forms in her original body and confronts J.J.; it's revealed that J.J. is actually an entity from the ionosphere who, after seeing Jennifer recharge there so many times and becoming jealous of what humanity had, stole her DNA and identity and left her for dead. After a massive fight Jennifer defeats the ionospheric entity by absorbing her, and later defeats the newly-empowered and vengeful Chief Ana Lopez.

 McClain also portrays Gen of Earth-1, who sided against the A.S.A. and became their prisoner after removing all metahuman abilities in Freeland via the water supply. This version ceased to exist when Earth-Prime was formed.
 McClain also portrays Jinn of Earth-2, who sided with the A.S.A. and ended the Markovian threat before becoming a power-obsessed killer willing to kill her own family. This version ceased to exist when a new Earth-2 was formed.

Anissa Pierce / Thunder / Blackbird

Anissa Pierce (portrayed by Nafessa Williams; seasons 1-4) is the older daughter of Jefferson Pierce and Lynn Stewart and a metahuman like her father and younger sister Jennifer. She is a medical student who works as a part-time teacher at Garfield High.
 
Anissa is an outspoken young woman who is described as "Harriet Tubman" by her sister Jennifer due to her avid support of the Black Lives Matter movement and Black Rights in general. At the start of the series, she is bailed out of jail by her sister and father due to her joining a protest against the 100 that turns violent. After provoking and publicly attacking Will (a member of the 100 and Lala's nephew) in defense of Jennifer after he got Jennifer into trouble with the gang, Anissa and her sister are kidnapped by Will and small group of gangsters during the class she was teaching. Fortunately, Black Lightning resurfaces and rescues them. Later that night, Anissa begins to undergo a panic attack that awakens her latent metahuman abilities, which (unbeknownst to her) she inherited from her father, breaking her bathroom sink in half. Anissa does not immediately realize that she is a metahuman and continues to briefly go on with life, believing it to have been an "accident". Anissa, who is openly lesbian, breaks up with her girlfriend Chenoa due to losing interest in her and begins to investigate her new abilities after her powers awaken again during a store robbery she is able to stop using them. She determines that she has enhanced strength and density when taking deep breaths that she can activate and deactivate at will by controlling her breathing. This makes her virtually invincible so long as she can continue to control her inhalation. In addition, she has an accelerated healing factor that mends injuries of her body far beyond the capabilities of an ordinary human. Anissa begins to look into her family history while also making a friend and possible new love interest in bartender Grace Choi while also doing vigilante work. Anissa learns that her grandfather was a journalist who investigated a group of young metahumans who disappeared years ago. Anissa eventually finds his research and decides to share it with her mother, Lynn Stewart, a neuroscientist, although she does not immediately tell her why she is researching their history. Lynn is attacked by members of the 100 shortly after, who tie her up and tape her mouth shut in her office forcing Anissa to use her powers to help her mother. While she successfully scares them away, Black Lightning shows up, wrongly believing a masked Anissa to be the culprit of a still tied-up Lynn's kidnapping. The two metahumans confront one another, and after Black Lightning inevitably wins and injures Anissa, Lynn reveals the truth and laments that both her children are metahumans.

In season three, Anissa takes on the alias of Blackbird when liberating young metahumans from the A.S.A. buses as Gambi secretly assists her. She later reunited with Grace and accepts her metahuman abilities. Anissa is erased during the Crisis on Infinite Earths when a wave of anti-matter destroys the entire universe. She is restored when her Earth is merged with Earth-1 and Earth-38 to form Earth-Prime. Blackbird continues helping the resistance as Black Lightning allows her to make the calls. When Lynn is taken to Markovia, Anissa plans to take part in the rescue mission where she is persuaded by Grace to let her assist in it. When it comes to the raid on the Markovian facility, Thunder had to strike Erica Moran until she had absorbed enough kinetic energy enough to knock down a strong door. When the Markovians attacked South Freeland, Thunder and Grace assisted Black Lightning in fighting them. Anissa and Grace later invite everybody to their engagement party to get that out of the way before the Markovians begin their invasion on Freeland. When in the Pit, Thunder and Grace confront Gravedigger who controls Grace into attacking Thunder. She was forced to use her abilities to knock her out. Following the attack on Freeland, Lynn tells Thunder that Grace is in a coma where she is unsure when she'll come out of it as Lynn plans to make sure that Grace receives full care. Thunder accompanied Black Lightning, Lynn, and Lightning to a congressional committee where they present the briefcase that exposes the A.S.A.'s experiments as well as Markovia's own experiments.

Describing her character as a positive role model, Williams said "I'm just really grateful to tell the story for young lesbians – and black lesbians in particular ... My hope is that when you watch Anissa, a young lesbian is inspired to walk boldly as who she is and to love herself and to love herself exactly how she looks."

 Williams also portrays her Earth-1 counterpart, who witnessed her father being executed by the A.S.A. for his involvement with the metahuman underground railroad. This version ceased to exist when Earth-Prime was formed.
 Williams also portrays her Earth-2 counterpart, who is killed by Jinn alongside her family when they tried to intervene. This version ceased to exist when a new Earth-2 was formed.

Lynn Stewart

Lynn Stewart (portrayed by Christine Adams; seasons 1-4) is a highly learned doctor and neurologist as well as the ex-wife of Jefferson and the mother of Jennifer and Anissa Pierce.

Several years before the onset of the series, Lynn divorced and convinced Jefferson to retire as Black Lightning to protect their two daughters as his vigilante work often brought him home battered and wounded; on occasion even bleeding in front of Jennifer. Years later, Lynn and Jefferson begin to get close again, giving Jeff hope of reconciliation before their daughters are kidnapped and he is forced to use his powers for the first time in years to save them, although he promises Lynn that it would be a one-time deal. After the death of his former student LaWanda White, Jeff decides to return to being Black Lightning, much to Lynn's frustration as this pushes back their relationship, which had finally started to heal. Lynn attempts to convince Peter Gambi (Jeff's enabler and surrogate father) to tell him to stop, to no avail. Lynn begins to realize Anissa is acting strange and inquires into this unsuccessfully, although she assures her that she will support her no matter what. Despite not wanting to get involved with Black Lightning, Lynn is instrumental in convincing Jefferson to not kill Tobias Whale, leader of the 100 and the man who killed his father. Lynn later begins to investigate the effects of a new drug called "Green Light" and its effects on the brain, which are similar to what appears to happen to Jefferson when he uses his powers. She is also given a box by Anissa containing Jefferson's father's genetic research on the metagene due to the disappearance of a group of teenagers years prior to his eventual death. Anissa dismisses her curiosity as her simply doing an assignment on their family history. Shortly thereafter, Lynn is attacked by 100 gangsters. Fortunately, Anissa shows up dressed in disguise and uses her abilities to disarm and scare off the attackers. Before she can help a shocked Lynn, Black Lightning arrives and wrongfully believes a masked Anissa to be Lynn's attacker. The two metahumans get into a heated confrontation with Jefferson emerging as the victor, although he soon regrets this as he realizes who she is. Lynn and Jefferson lament that Anissa has gained powers and has followed in Black Lightning's dangerous footsteps. Lynn analyses Anissa's wounds and realizes she has very fast healing abilities like her father.

In season three, Lynn starts working for the A.S.A. as she works to find a way to stabilize the metahuman gene. While using a filtered version of Green Light, Lynn was able to come up with the vaccines which also involved some DNA samples taken from Tobias Whale. Whale starts to play with her mind where he wanted the info on the metahumans the A.S.A. had. She gives them to him, but leaves out the information on Wendy Hernandez and Erica Moran. She is erased during the Crisis on Infinite Earths when a wave of antimatter destroys the entire universe. Lynn is restored when her Earth is merged with Earth-1 and Earth-38 to form Earth-Prime. Both Jennifer and Jefferson find that she has become addicted to the modified Green Light. After receiving help from Sergeant Gardner Grayle into sneaking Tobias Whale out of the Pit, both of them were tasered by a Markovian operative who contacts Colonel Mosin to send Instant over. Lynn and Tobias are taken to Markovia where she is reunited with Jace. This led to a cat fight which Yuri Mosin broke up. He reveals to Lynn the knowledge of what Lynn has done to stabilize the metahuman gene from his double agent Nurse Michael Allen and leaves her a Green Light to help her out. As Jace works to gain Lynn's trust, she does tell Jace that she needs some medicine to deal with the Green Light withdrawal. Then she meets Gravedigger when he was given orders to take over the operation from Mosin. Lynn does a trick to get Gravedigger to give him his DNA sample which enabled her to make a 20-minute Green Light with a copy of his mind-control. While it worked on Mosin, it couldn't work on Gravedigger when he caught up to the group. As Lynn started to surrender to Gravedigger, Black Lightning arrived and shocked Gravedigger into submission. Then Black Lightning and Lynn got on the helicopter and retreated back to Freeland. Lynn continued to go through withdrawal symptoms as she has Jennifer fry the Green Light she hid in the bathroom. She was present when Gambi used the briefcase's information to explain the history of Gravedigger and the United States' collaboration with Markovia on a metahuman project. Lynn states that she left the meta-boost formula in Markovia. After working in the lab, Lynn informs Jefferson that his DNA and Gravedigger's DNA are a match meaning that they are related. As she works on the anti-boost serum to use on Gravedigger, Lynn is confronted by Commander Carson Williams who is on a mission to eliminate classified information where he mentions that he already did away with Dr. Jace. Briefly copying Erica's powers, Lynn kills Commander Williams in self-defense. With the anti-boost serum made, she uses them on Gravedigger enabling Black Lightning to defeat him as he then evacuates everyone from the Pit which has been set to self-destruct. After examining Grace, Lynn states to Anissa that she is in a coma where she is unsure when she'll come out of it while advising she gets full care. Lynn later accompanied Black Lightning, Thunder, and Lightning to a congressional committee where they present the briefcase that exposes the A.S.A.'s experiments as well as Markovia's own experiments.

 Adams also portrays her Earth-1 counterpart, who visits Gen in The Pit after Jefferson was killed by the A.S.A. This version ceased to exist when Earth-Prime was formed.
 Adams also portrays her Earth-2 counterpart, who is killed by Jinn alongside the rest of her family when they tried to intervene. This version ceased to exist when a new Earth-2 was formed.

Tobias Whale

Tobias Whale (portrayed by Marvin "Krondon" Jones III; seasons 1-4) is a crime lord who leads the 100 Gang and the main antagonist of the series.
 
Tobias is an African-American albino who is portrayed as cruel and seemingly loathes his "Black" heritage as he casually but very often expresses that he prefers the company of "White people" and refers to "Black" individuals distastefully as "negroes". This expressed usually by his left and right-hand man and woman Joey Toledo and Syonide who are always with him. Though this is contradicted by his apparent great love for his sister, Tori, who is a Black African-American (that is, without albinism). Tobias is first shown scolding Latavius, one of his main subordinates, on the apparent return of Black Lightning (whom he believed was deceased after his disappearance years earlier), asking if he believes in the "Resurrection". Tobias built his "street cred" around his apparent murdering Black Lightning and was gifted the 100 gang by a group of unseen, powerful underworld gangsters for it. They assign a woman named Lady Eve to watch over their investment in him and he reports to her. After Latavius is incarcerated for the death of LaWanda White (a civilian of Freeland who wanted her daughter back from the 100), Tobias, Toledo and Syonide infiltrate the jail with their connections at the police station and murder Lala as he is a liability. Tobias next attempts to assassinate Black Lightning after he appears before a mob of marchers against the 100. The bullet he fires misses and instead hits Jefferson's daughter's boyfriend, Khalil, whose spine is severed, but no one sees Tobias except Peter Gambi, who curiously erases the footage and keeps it from Jefferson. Tobias meets with Lady Eve, who expresses aversion with the uproar the 100 is receiving for paralyzing a potential "Olympic star", a fact Tobias mostly shrugs off. It is revealed that Tobias killed Jefferson Pierce's father years before the onset of the series when Jeff was a kid, but has maintained the same youthful appearance apparently due to an unnamed serum that sustains his youth and seemingly inhumane strength. Upon discovering that Tobias is in Freeland, Jefferson attempts to assassinate Tobias in return, but is convinced otherwise and Tobias escapes. Tobias next begins to release a drug called Greenlight that seems to temporarily enhance the user's strength while in a blind rage-filled frenzy but is highly unstable. Tobias's sister arrives in Freeland and suggests they turn the people of the city against Black Lightning. Together they decide to finally deal with their father, who was abusive towards them as children. Tobias breaks his back, mercilessly "letting him die" alone with no help. Later, Tobias and Syonide convince Khalil that they have a way to make him walk again. Sometime after this, Tobias and his sister are subsequently attacked by Black Lightning while attending a club. After Lady Eve and Peter Gambi murder Toledo, Tobias and Tori plot to kill Evelyn in revenge. Tobias's people are badly overpowered and he is injured while a stray bullet hits and kills Tori. His henchmen guide him out of the building. Using his contact with ASA operative Martin Proctor, Tobias Whale turns Khalil Payne into Painkiller. In the season finale, Tobias uses Lala as a bomb mule as he, Syonide, and Painkiller raid an A.S.A. building. Proctor escaped, but they got the briefcase he had.

In season two, Tobias Whale goes to visit the crypt of Tori to pay his respects where he is arrested by Deputy Chief Henderson and his fellow police officers for the murder of Alvin Pierce. Tobias is released from police custody when District Attorney Montez does not think that Jefferson's eyewitness testimony will stick. During "The Book of Rebellion" arc, Tobias Whale sends Painkiller to kill Reverend Jeremiah Holt, who wouldn't relocate his clinic as suggested by Councilman Kwame Parker. When Tobias got tired of waiting and Painkiller failed to get Reverend Holt to leave town, he placed a bounty on Painkiller, which gets fulfilled by Giselle Cutter and ends with Tobias ripping out his spinal implant and leaving him for dead. During these episodes, Tobias also gets a young prodigy named Todd Green on his side. The episode "The Book of Secrets: Chapter One: Prodigal Son" revealed that he was an old friend of Helga Jace, who made his anti-aging serum. After Todd orchestrates Jace's jailbreak in secret, she takes Tobias to where the remaining pod children are held, as he makes plans for them. In the season 2 finale, Tobias unleashes the Masters of Disaster on Freeland while also having the 100 cause riots. When Lightning confronts Tobias Whale after Cutter leaves him, she nearly kills him for what he did to Painkiller until Black Lightning shows up and talks her out of it. Lightning helps her father defeat Tobias who is then remanded to an off the books meta-human prison called the "Pit."

In season three, Tobias is looking older without his serum and his hair has grown in. Issa Williams uses his truth-extracting abilities on Tobias where he reveals that Proctor worked for Odell and that Odell works for the President of the United States. Odell later tries to get the location of the briefcase out of him to no avail even when he used ultraviolet lights on him. Tobias later has a hallucination of Black Lightning taunting him. When working on stabilizing the meta-gene, Lynn works on Tobias where she uses the same serum on him that restores his body. Tobias voices his knowledge that Black Lightning and Jefferson Pierce are one person and vows to deal with him when he gets out. Lynn then extracts a bone marrow sample from Tobias joking that she forgot the anesthetic. When Tobias is snuck out of the Pit and knocked out by Lynn, a Markovian operative tasered Lynn and Gardner Grayle while arranging for Instant to take Lynn and Tobias to Markovia. Once there, Yuri Mosin's double agent Nurse Michael Allen continued to extract the bone marrow from Tobias to further the Markovians' plans to stabilize the metahumans on their side. When Tobias is rescued by Black Lightning, he voices to Black Lightning that he knows his identity. This causes Black Lightning to knock him out. It was mentioned that Tobias got away as Mosin reports to Gravedigger that his men can't find him. Tobias makes his way to Nurse Michael Allen's house where he has killed his dad and spared his mom. He wants Nurse Allen to take him to where the metahumans in Markovia's custody are. Tobias later watches the news about Markovia's prime minister refusing to give restitution for Markovia's attack on Freeland as he plans to make his own return to Freeland.

In season four taking place one year later after the Markovian invasion, Tobias started becoming a philanthropist while gaining Val Seong and Red as his allies and the use of Agent Odell's A.I. Katie. While still planning to eliminate the Pierce family, he also had Mayor Billy Black killed for not going ahead with his suggestion to level Garfield High. During the promotion of the new DEGs, Tobias announces that he is starting a campaign to become the new Mayor of Freeland. After getting a device from Marshall Bates and combining it with Val's DNA sample, Tobias starts to negate the Pierce family's metahuman abilities in the device's range. In addition, he also works to get the Shadow Board on his side. Black Lightning has his final showdown with Tobias Whale which ends with Tobias accidentally falling out the window and getting impaled on a spike. Defiant, Tobias starts shooting at Black Lightning, before the hero is forced to electrocute Tobias to death.

Bill Henderson

Inspector William "Bill" Henderson (portrayed by Damon Gupton; seasons 1-3) is a police detective and Jefferson's best friend who is oblivious to his alter ego as Black Lightning and hunts him due to believing he is an outlaw and vigilante. After exposing the dirty Deputy Chief Zeke Cayman, he is appointed to replace him.

In season two, Henderson eventually learns that Jefferson is Black Lightning, fracturing their relationship. He later informed Jefferson that Detective Summers was killed and to use Black Lightning to track down one of the people who is known for setting fires to cars. Also, Henderson learned that Jefferson was replaced as principal in light of the 100's attack on Garfield High. Once that was done, Henderson is informed by Black Lightning that the person was hired by Tobias Whale. This leads Henderson and his police officers to track down Tobias Whale at his sister's crypt where Henderson led in his arrest. Then Henderson informed Jefferson that they finally caught Tobias Whale and wanted him to be the first to know about it. While he does place Helga Jace in his custody after Lynn Stewart subdues her, he finds Jace not in her cell due to the bounty hunter Instant having taken her to the Markovians while having killed some police officers in the process. After Tobias Whale is defeated, Henderson is seen driving through the streets as Black Lightning and Thunder put an end to the 100-established riots.

In season three, Henderson is now the chief of police and is intimidated by Commander Carson Williams to do a press conference about the A.S.A.'s enforced curfew or else he will make things miserable for his family. Henderson had no choice but to agree to the terms. Unbeknownst to the A.S.A., Henderson started a secret resistance movement against the A.S.A. with the help of Blackbird. During the Markovian invasion of Freeland, Henderson is assisted in protecting the suspected metahumans by Lala and the remnants of the 100. Stumbling on some Markovian soldiers planning to ambush Black Lightning, Henderson shoots them and ends up in a mutual kill with the final Markovian soldier in the process. Before dying in Black Lightning's arms, Henderson advises him not to disappoint Freeland.

Peter Gambi

Peter Gambi (portrayed by James Remar in normal form, Justin Livingston in cloaked form; seasons 1-4) is a tailor who is the main benefactor and surrogate father of Jefferson Pierce. He took him in after Alvin Pierce's death and is also shown to have some connection with Lady Eve. His real name is Peter Esposito and was a former member of the A.S.A. working under Martin Proctor until he turned against the organization and gave information to Alvin Pierce, resulting in his murder.

In season two, Gambi encounters Kara Fowdy who informs him that Proctor's briefcase is in Tobias Whale's possession. Gambi assists Anissa in obtaining money to save a clinic from being closed down and finds a badly-wounded Kara Fowdy. He tends to her injuries as he tries to get the info on where Tobias has the briefcase. When the clinic was nearly-bombed, Peter faces the female culprit until she gets away by hijacking a guy's motorcycle. Before Kara Fowdy dies, she gives her cell phone to Gambi with the information that he is looking for on it. Gambi is later ambushed during a drive and is presumed dead after being run off the road with his car exploding. He faked his death to find out who called the hit and later reunited with the Pierce family. Gambi later makes a special suit for Jennifer when she becomes Lightning.

In season three, Gambi helps Anissa out with her Blackbird operations where he event created the A.I. Shonda for her apartment. To get close to the A.S.A, Gambi uses the holographic cloaking technology to assume the appearance of a random soldier. He is erased during the Crisis on Infinite Earths when a wave of anti-matter destroys the entire universe. Gambi is restored when his Earth is merged with Earth-1 and Earth-38 to form Earth-Prime. When Black Lightning and Lightning's experiences with alternate realities was brought up, Gambi has no memories of that and had found traces of anti-matter energy explaining that they are the only ones who remember. While planning to check the failsafe in the suit that the A.S.A. provided Jennifer, Gambi finds that Baron was led into his lair as he learns his connections with Black Lightning, Thunder, and Lightning. While treating Baron, Gambi later finds him on the floor after his abilities enabled him to find info on his computer on who tried to have Gambi killed as the picture he found shows Lady Eve. At the time when Black Lightning and Thunder had briefly abducted Odell, it was revealed that Gambi was previously trained by Odell during Gambi's time with the A.S.A. When Lynn has been taken to Markovia by Instant, Gambi is among those who plan to rescue her as Gambi had some business that he did there. Gambi and T.C. coordinated the rescue of Lynn once they arrived. Gambi later spoke to Dr. Jace stating that he should've disobeyed orders and killed her when they first met. After Gambi ripped out an eye of one of the twins that worked for her, Lady Eve met with Gambi at a tailor shop. She gives him the briefcase that was previously in Tobias' possession that Lala gave her. After TC unlocks the briefcase, Gambi reveals the information about the United States' collaboration on the metahuman project to Jefferson and Lynn which turned Tyson Sykes into Gravedigger. Gambi later plans to officiate the engagement of Anissa and Grace. During the Markovian invasion, Gambi and TC coordinate Black Lightning in rescuing Lightning and warning them that Odell set the Pit to self-destruct. Afterwards, Gambi and T.C. get into a shootout with Major Sara Grey and the A.S.A. soldiers with her which ends with Gambi and T.C. emerging victorious.

In season four, Gambi works with his old comrade Lauren Caruso on the new D.E.G.s while planning to improve the superhero costumes to withstand them. He even worked on a machine to restore Jennifer after she exploded. When Lynn used a special meta-booster on Gambi to find out Val Seong's metahuman abilities, the two of them alongside Jefferson and T.C. find that Val has power negating abilities. In addition, Gambi and Jefferson discover that Red is the one who has magnetic abilities when they view footage of him threatening Marshall Bates to get the device that Tobias Whale needs in 48 hours or else. Following the death of Tobias Whale, Gambi passes his torch to T.C. while planning to do some tinkering on the side.

Khalil Payne / Painkiller

Khalil Payne (portrayed by Jordan Calloway; main: seasons 2-4; recurring: season 1) is a track star at Garfield High and Jennifer's ex-boyfriend. After a bullet from Syonide's gun paralyzes him from the waist down, he becomes involved with Tobias Whale where he undergoes an experimental treatment done by the A.S.A. involving a spinal implant that gives him enhanced abilities, becomes a cyborg in the process. Tobias Whale is the one who names Khalil's new form of Painkiller.

In light of Syonide's death in season two, Tobias has Painkiller do her duties as well where one of them resulted in the death of 100 member Rheon when collecting the protection money. After Tobias Whale rips out his spinal implant for being unable to kill Reverend Holt, Painkiller dies from his injuries in the hospital as Jennifer and Nichelle mourn his death. Though Khalil somehow appears alive in one of the pods in Agent Odell's possession.

In season three, Odell had a brain chip placed in Painkiller's head to make him obedient and uses him to kill his own mother with a poisonous touch that the A.S.A. placed in him after she was heard on a resistance transmission stating what Tobias Whale made the A.S.A. do to her son. After Lightning destroyed the Markovian facility that was just cleared out by Black Lightning and the A.S.A. commandos, Odell sends Painkiller to a house where some Markovians are hiding out and slays them. Painkiller is later assigned Black Lightning as a target. During the fight at Franklin Terrace, Painkiller engages Thunder and is knocked out of the window by him. Both Painkiller and Carson Williams were evacuated from the area. When it came to the A.S.A.'s mission to rescue Odell, Painkiller was knocked out by Lightning who was shocked to see him alive. TC later translated his technology to Jennifer stating that Painkiller still loves her. With help from TC and Gambi, Jennifer created a firewall to trap the Painkiller program enabling Khalil to regain control of his body. Due to what the A.S.A. did to his body, Khalil states to Jennifer that they can't be together. Jefferson arranged for Major Grey to remove Khalil from their system as part of the conditions for a collaboration to rescue Lynn. While reluctant to help in rescuing Lynn due to what the A.S.A. did to him, Khalil decided to help out. During the raid of the Markovian facility, Khalil faced off against Gravedigger and got overpowered. He managed to get out of the facility. After Painkiller briefly broke free from the firewall due to a glitch, Khalil fought him back and elected to keep his distance from Jennifer. When some Markovian soldiers attack, Painkiller breaks free and kills them. Then he traps Khalil behind the same firewall before resuming his mission to kill the Pierce family. When Painkiller tries to snipe Lightning, Khalil breaks free and ultimately defeats the Painkiller program. Then he confronts Odell in the backseat of his car. When Black Lightning advises Khalil not to kill Odell, he just shoots where his spleen and leaves him for Black Lightning as he walks off.

In season four, Khalil is now operating in Akashic Valley and helps to rescue Grace from the minions of Maya Odell. During this time, he did managed to make an agreement with Painkiller for him to take over if things get difficult while also developing the ability to alter his glands so that he can do both a poisonous touch and an antidotic touch. Maya's actions earned her the wrath of Painkiller who vows to find her. Upon supporting T.C.'s claim that Tobias Whale is behind Jefferson Pierce being accused of embezzlement, Khalil agrees to help him. He pays a visit to Jesse Gentilucci who gives him the location of the hidden ledger that would help him deal with Tobias Whale. After apprehending Looker, Khalil is intercepted by Ishmael where Painkiller kills him by getting his poison on the hilt of Ishmael's sword. Then Khalil hands Looker over to Detective Shakur and Kevin Mason while providing the rest of the anti-poison for Looker. Following the death of Tobias Whale, T.C. helps Khalil and Painkiller get rid of the kill code at the cost of Khalil's memories of the Pierce family.

Grace Choi / Wylde
 
Grace Choi / Shay Li Wylde (portrayed by Chantal Thuy; main: season 4; recurring: seasons 2-3; guest: season 1) Stella Smith in teenager form, Joseph Steven Yang in old man form) is a bartender who becomes Anissa's girlfriend. Later on after a night with Anissa, Grace starts developing spots on her body which she counters with some pills. When Anissa finds one of Grace's pills and she is nowhere to be found, Gambi learns that Grace was an alias used after being rescued from a prostitution ring by ICE

When she reunites with Anissa, Grace reveals her shapeshifting abilities where she can assume the form of a teenager, an old man, and a leopard. Anissa accepts Grace's metahuman status as they rekindle their love relationship. Gambi even helps to get Grace's powers under control. After killing an A.S.A soldier in her leopard form, Grace learns that Jefferson is Black Lightning due to maintaining the scents of people from her leopard form. After sparring with Anissa, Grace persuades her to let her help in rescuing Lynn from the Markovians. When the Markovians attack South Freeland, Grace helps Black Lightning and Thunder fight them. Then the two of them have their engagement party to get that out of the way before the Markovians begin their invasion. During the Markovian invasion of Freeland, Grace is mind-controlled by Gravedigger to fight Thunder causing Thunder to use her powers to knock out Grace. Lynn later states that Grace is in a coma where she is unsure when she'll wake up. Though she will need to be taken somewhere to receive full care.

The character was promoted to Series Regular in November 2020. In season four, Grace was still in a coma. She later comes out of it and officially marries Anissa.

Recurring characters
This is a list of recurring actors and the characters they portrayed in multiple episodes, which were significant roles, sometimes across multiple seasons. The characters are listed by the season in which they first appeared.

Overview

Introduced in season one

Kiesha Henderson
Kiesha Henderson (portrayed by Kyanna Simone Simpson) is Henderson's daughter and Jennifer's best friend, who encourages Jennifer to challenge her perfect image.

Kara Fowdy
Kara Fowdy (portrayed by Skye P. Marshall) is Garfield High's vice-principal. She is later revealed to be a spotter for the A.S.A. who reports on metahuman sightings at the school to them. After the A.S.A.'s rogue operation was exposed, Kara leaves the A.S.A. and plans to reclaim the briefcase that was stolen by Tobias Whale. During the heist, Kara got harpooned by Tobias and jumped out the window. She was later found by Gambi. Before dying in Gambi's arms at his hideout, she gives her phone to him that contains the information that he needs.

Latavius Johnson / Tattoo Man

Latavius "Lala" Johnson (portrayed by William Catlett) is a member of the 100 and former student of Jefferson Pierce who is in charge of the Seahorse Motel that the 100 use as a front for their prostitution ring. When Jefferson became Black Lightning and rescued Anissa and Jennifer, Lala escapes and is brought to Tobias Whale by Syonide and Joey Toledo as Tobias wants him dead. After killing his cousin Will for drawing Black Lightning to him, Lala resumed the activity at the Seahorse Motel where he is defeated by Black Lightning and arrested by Inspector Henderson. When at the police station, Lala is killed by Tobias Whale for his repeated failures to dispose of Black Lightning after he and Syonide were snuck into the police station by Zeke Cayman. Lala is later resurrected by Lady Eve's magic dust and starts seeing Lawanda's ghost and Will's ghost where their tattoos appear on his body. In addition, he starts to demonstrate super-strength. After regaining control of Lala and mentioning the ghosts being a side effect of the reanimation project he was put through, Tobias uses him as a bomb mule in an attempt to kill Martin Proctor.

In season two, Lala is put together again through an unknown method by a man named Lazarus Prime. After recapping that he killed his friend Earl to keep the 100 from killing him, Lala sees Earl's ghost and gets his tattoo on him. He then plans to do some redemption by resuming his revenge plot on Tobias Whale. When he finally confronts Tobias after saving Black Lightning from Heatstroke and Cutter taking her leave, Tobias uses the phrase "E pluribus unum" which surfaces the tattoos of Lala's other victims enough to disable him in a painful way.

In season three, Lala later wakes up in a hotel near a briefcase as he works to reclaim the 100's territory. He now possesses the ability to not feel pain due to the ghosts of the people he killed that are now in him. During this time, he starts to develop a competition with a revived Lady Eve. In the next meeting, Lady Eve revealed to Lala that she created the programming used on him as she quotes "E pluribus unm" and another quote which made him obedient. He was able to give the briefcase that he planned to use to lure out Tobias to her. Black Lightning and Thunder try to recruit Lala and the remnants of the 100 to help fight the Markovians with no avail. After meeting with Lady Eve, Lala has Devonte torture Dr. Matthew Blair for information on where Tobias Whale is. Following a shootout with Major Sara Grey, Lady Eve has Destiny inform Lala that the A.S.A. plans to nuke Freeland if the Markovians can't be defeated, This causes Lala and the remnants of the 100 to join the fight where they assist Chief Henderson in shooting the Markovian soldiers.

In season four, Lala and the 100 are in a turf war with the Kobra Cartel. After Lydell Green accidentally killed Marcel Payton's son leading to Blackbird declaring a parking lot neutral territory for both sides and the homeless, Lala later killed Lydell which caused Lydell's tattoo to manifest on the back of Lala's right hand. Lala also has been streaming the illegal cage fight with viewers placing their bets on who would win the match. Lala later fights Ishmael who slays him and buries his body in cement. Lala's cement tomb was later given to Tobias Whale by Destiny. During the fight between Black Lightning and Tobias Whale, Lala's cement tomb was knocked down. This later revived Lala as he finds Tobias' dead body outside while noting that someone managed to do away with him.

Syonide

Syonide (portrayed by Charlbi Dean) is Tobias Whale's henchwoman, hit person, and mob enforcer. As an infant, she was found in the dumpster with her umbilical cord wrapped around her. When she was eight years old, Tobias discovered her in an orphanage, where she was abused and malnourished. He took her in and trained her in the art of assassination while also having her put through a painful procedure that involved placing carbon fiber armor beneath her skin. Syonide is later killed in battle against Kara Fowdy.

Joey Toledo

Joey Toledo (portrayed by Eric Mendenhall) is Tobias Whale's right-hand man and mob enforcer. He is killed by a disguised Gambi who made it look like that Lady Eve called the hit.

John Webb
John Webb (portrayed by Tommy Kane) is a news reporter for WIXA 7 that reports on Freeland's activities.

Zeke Cayman
Zeke Cayman (portrayed by Anthony Reynolds) is a corrupt deputy chief of the Freeland Police Department who has connections with the A.S.A and Tobias Whale. He is tasked by Kara with framing Jefferson for drug dealing, but is subsequently arrested by Henderson alongside those involved after Henderson got a confession from Detective Grunion.

Jeremiah Holt
Jeremiah Holt (portrayed by Clifton Powell) is a reverend looking to challenge the 100. During a sermon, Holt collapses from a poisoned handkerchief that Cutter secretly placed on him. This enabled her to finish the job that Painkiller was unable to do. However, he was actually placed in a coma due to the "intervention of the Lord" and later leads his people in a prayer at the time of the 100-caused riots.

In season three, he was able to get a tour of the A.S.A.'s facility and later assists in Blackbird's metahuman version of the Underground Railroad. Henderson uses a claim of an illegal crime to apprehend Reverend Holt so that he can bring him and Two-Bits into his secret resistance movement.

 Powell also portrays his Earth-1 counterpart, who ran a metahuman underground railroad alongside Jefferson. After he was caught by the A.S.A., he confessed to everything during the subsequent interrogation before they killed him. This version ceased to exist when Earth-Prime was formed.

Lady Eve

Evelyn Stillwater-Ferguson (portrayed by Jill Scott) is the owner of a funeral parlor who connects Tobias Whale with the Shadow Board, a secret group of corrupt leaders that gave him leadership over the 100. She was also a former agent of the A.S.A. who had connections with Peter Gambi and Agent Odell. Lady Eve is later murdered by Tobias' men as part of a plan to frame Black Lightning and also avenging Joey Toledo when Peter Gambi left the blame of his death on Lady Eve's group.

It was later revealed in season two that she was an old friend of Lazarus Prime who taught him some of her tricks.

In season three, Baron later found her picture on Gambi's computer when trying to find out who tried to have Gambi killed. Lady Eve was shown to be revived offscreen and is the head of the Ultimate O business where she starts to develop some competition with Lala and the remnants of the 100. In the next meeting, Lady Eve revealed to Lala that she created the programming used on him as she quotes "E pluribus unm" and another quote which made him obedient. He was able to give the briefcase that he planned to use to lure out Tobias to her. After the eye of one her twin minions was ripped out by Gambi, Lady Eve meets with Gambi. She gives him the briefcase that Lala planned to use to lure out Tobias. Lady Eve later meets with Agent Odell about getting her spot on the Shadow Board back in exchange for information on where the briefcase is. In their discussion, Lady Eve mentioned to Odell that Lazarus Prime is still around. Then Lady Eve met with Lala about who he can ask about Tobias Whale's last known location. Lady Eve meets with Major Sara Grey informing her that the briefcase is with Peter Gambi. Grey states that her reinstatement in the Shadow Board will happen and plans to have her relocated to Gotham City. Figuring out that the A.S.A. will nuke Freeland if the Markovians can't be defeated, Lady Eve and her men get into a shootout with Major Grey and those with her. A wounded Lady Eve gets away and contacts Destiny to have Lala and the remnants of the 100 fight the Markovian invaders.

In season four, Ana Lopez does a broadcast about the gang war between the 100 and the Kobra Cartel where she claims that Lady Eve is heading it even though nobody has seen her since the Markovian invasion.

Nichelle Payne
Nichelle Payne (portrayed by Yolanda T. Ross) is the mother of Khalil. Odell later controlled Painkiller into poisoning her. Then he covered it up to Lightning by claiming that the Markovians were responsible for Nichelle's death.

Frank "Two-Bits" Tanner
Frank "Two-Bits" Tanner (portrayed by Jason Louder) is Jefferson's childhood friend who sells drugs and bootleg DVDs on the streets. He has since become an occasional informant for Black Lightning.

In season three, Two-Bits is shown to be against the A.S.A.'s activities in Freeland while operating a bar. Henderson uses a claim of an illegal crime to apprehend Two-Bits so that he can bring him and Reverend Holt into his secret resistance movement. During the Markovian invasion, Frank "Two-Bits" Tanner assists Henderson and the police in fighting the Markovian soldiers until they are assisted by Lala and the remnants of the 100.

Gina
Gina (portrayed by Veronika Rowe) is the aunt of Lana. She and her sister visited Jefferson and Lynn for what Jennifer did to Lana.

In season three, Gina joins the resistance against the A.S.A.

Kyrie
Kyrie (portrayed by Renell Gibbs) is a man who later joins the resistance against the A.S.A.

In season four, Kyrie is killed by Ishmael when trying to get information from him about Blackbird.

Martin Proctor
Martin Proctor (portrayed by Gregg Henry) is a member of the A.S.A. who initially wants to kill Black Lightning, but changes his mind when he realizes that his DNA can be used to create metahuman soldiers. Peter Gambi is associated with him. During a confrontation at one of the warehouses storing the metahuman stasis pods, Martin is briefly attacked by Jennifer and shot by Gambi. Tobias Whale had his thumbs salvaged by an ally at the coroner's office to access the contents of his briefcase. It was revealed in Season Three during Issa's truth-extracting interrogation on Tobias Whale that Proctor worked for Odell.

Introduced in season two

Percy Odell
Percy Odell (portrayed by Bill Duke) is an A.S.A. agent from Gotham City investigating the "rogue operation" conducted by Martin Proctor who has connections with Lady Eve and was the one who trained Peter Gambi. He reluctantly allows Lynn to take over management of the Green Light victims. Though he starts to get suspicious of the Pierce family while planning to weaponize the Green Light victims. After confirming his suspicions and following Tobias Whale's defeat, Odell confronts the Pierce family to tell them that the pods have started to attract the attention of the Markovians as he would like Black Lightning, Thunder, and Lightning to help the A.S.A. when the Markovians bring their battle to Freeland.

In season three, Odell has Black Lightning and Lynn Stewart in his custody to evade the Markovians from claiming them. It was revealed during Issa's truth-extraction interrogation on Tobias Whale that Proctor worked for Odell who works for the President of the United States. While enabling Jefferson and Lynn to make contact with their children, he uses a brain chip to control Painkiller into poisoning his own mother. When Odell is shot during an A.S.A. shootout with Yuri Mosin and Instant, Major Sara Grey becomes the acting director of operations while Odell is recuperating. Odell later recovered and sent a video message to Jennifer to pick a side. Then he ordered Grey to weaponize the metahumans they have. When the anti-matter appeared in the sky, Odell's warning to Jennifer not to go outside came too late. In the aftermath of the Crisis that merged his Earth with Earth-1 and Earth-38 to form Earth-Prime, Odell continues to have the metahumans weaponized when Jennifer hasn't returned his calls. Sending an SUV with a holographic transmission to meet with Jennifer, he is told by Jennifer that she is done with him as the SUV drives off. Jefferson later arranges for his capture in a plan to fool the A.S.A. soldiers into withdrawing from Freeland. He is rescued by the A.S.A. operatives during Painkiller's fight with Black Lightning and leaves for Gotham City. He later returned and fulfilled the conditions that Jefferson gave in exchange for Lynn being rescued from Markovia. Though he mentions that the Markovians are at the borders again, Jefferson states that he'll only fight the Markovians for Freeland and not for the A.S.A. Odell later meets with Lady Eve who wants him to get her seat on the Shadow Board back in exchange for informing him where the briefcase is. In their discussion, Odell learns that Lazarus Prime is still around. During the Markovian invasion, Odell has Commander Williams remove every classified information and has Major Grey find the briefcase or destroy it. When Gravedigger gets into the Pit, he has his A.I. Katie set the Pit to self-destruct and uses the password "Rosebud." When he makes it to his car, he finds his driver dead and Khalil in the backseat. Black Lightning arrives and advises Khalil not to kill him. Khalil justs shoots him where his spleen is and leaves him for Black Lightning as he walks off. During Black Lightning's meeting with a congressional committee, Representative Nagar states that Odell will be prosecuted.

In season four, Odell is shown to be recuperating from the injury that Painkiller gave him. He is also shown to have a daughter named Maya who is operating in Akashic Valley. She calls Percy up to let him know about her minions' encounter with Painkiller.

 Duke also portrays his Earth-1 counterpart, who imprisoned Gen in the Pit for removing all metahuman abilities in Freeland via the water supply. After getting a confession from a captive Reverend Holt regarding the metahuman underground railroad, he led the A.S.A. to the Pierce home to confront Jefferson and execute him. This version ceased to exist when Earth-Prime was formed.
 Duke also portrays his Earth-2 counterpart, who gladly supported Jinn ending the Markovian threat in Freeland. This version ceased to exist when a new Earth-2 was formed.

Issa Williams
Issa Williams (portrayed by Myles Truitt) is a Green Light metahuman whose glowing jugular causes anyone he sees to tell the truth. The Pierce family takes him in after his mother rejects him, but he leaves with some family members after learning that he has only months left to live.

In season three, Issa is in A.S.A. custody where it is claimed by Odell that the Markovians abducted him and the A.S.A. rescued him. It was revealed during Issa's truth-extraction interrogation on Tobias Whale that Proctor worked for Odell who works for the President of the United States. Once Issa served his purpose, Odell spiked his food with an unspecified poison.

Wendy Hernandez
Wendy Hernandez (portrayed by Madison Bailey) is an aerokinetic metahuman previously obtained by the A.S.A. who is loosely based on Windfall. She is accidentally released from her stasis pod. Wendy suffers a psychotic break upon release and goes on a rampage, stopping only when Black Lightning shocks her. Afterwards, she chooses to go back into her pod until Lynn can find a cure. Though Lynn later works with her to master her abilities.

Perenna
Perenna (portrayed by Erika Alexander) is a psychic metahuman and one of Gambi's former A.S.A. contacts who steps in to help Jennifer control her powers.

Helga Jace

Dr. Helga Jace (portrayed by Jennifer Riker) is a convicted mad scientist from Markovia and old acquaintance of Tobias Whale who is roped into helping Lynn and the A.S.A. treat the metahumans. One notable illegal experiment that Dr. Jace did caused 10 people to lose their feet and one to die. To punish her, an implant is placed in her ankle that prevents Dr. Jace from leaving the designated area. After being re-incarcerated when some of the pod children die from the trial run of the treatment, she is sprung from her cell by Todd Greene where it was revealed that she made the anti-aging serum that Tobias took. Helga Jace then takes Tobias Whale to where the remaining pod children are. After being defeated by Lynn Stewart, Jace has some info for them to use. After giving them that info, Jace is taken away by Deputy Chief Henderson. While in police custody, she is taken by Instant who was hired by the Markovians to reclaim Jace.

In season three, Jace was seen with Yuri Mosin's Markovian army. After Instant leaves upon Mosin wiring the money to his account, Jace states that Lynn has found a way to stabilize the meta-gene as they will obtain the information so that they can stabilize the metahumans on the Markovians' side. Brandon mentioned to Jennifer that he came to Freeland to look for Jace who is responsible for killing his mother. When Lynn is brought to Markovia, Jace works to gain Lynn's trust. This results in a cat fight that is broken up by Mosin. While getting some medicing to deal with Lynn's Green Light withdrawal, Jace states to Mosin that she has won Lynn's trust. Gravedigger later appears to take over the operation from Mosin where it was revealed that he had the same serum that Jace made for Tobias Whale. When Black Lightning raids the facility, Brandon finally encountered Jace and started to create an earthquake only for Grayle to knock him out and have both of them evacuated. Gambi was revealed to have originally assisted in evacuating Dr. Jace from Markovia and stated that he should've disobeyed orders and did away with her. Jennifer brought Brandon to Dr. Jace to get information on her mother whose ashes he kept in crystallized form. She stated that she was killed by his father who also had earth-based forms. Brandon throws the crystallized ash into Dr. Jace's left shoulder and leaves with Jennifer. Brandon later held Dr. Jace in his apartment so that she can tell him all about his father. While Brandon is assisting Black Lightning in rescuing Lightning from the Markovians, Commander Williams breaks into Brandon's apartment and kills Dr. Jace as a way to remove classified information.

Mike Lowry
Mike Lowry (portrayed by P. J. Byrne) is a man who becomes the new principal at Garfield High with the aim of reversing what he sees as Jefferson's ineffective policies on school safety. He starts his "Zero Tolerance" policy on Sekou Hamilton and another student that were fighting where Sekou was expelled for throwing the first punch and the other student was suspended much to the dismay of Jefferson. Lowry's later argument with Jennifer about Khalil's mural goes viral as Jefferson persuades Dr. Frank to give Lowry a second chance to implement his plan.

In season three, the A.S.A. arrange for Lowry to give Jefferson's class to Mrs. Wellen and promote him to guidance counselor. When Tavon Singley is taken from a class for being a suspected metahuman, Lowry objects to this and is knocked down by Major Sara Grey.

Giselle Cutter
Giselle Cutter (portrayed by Kearran Giovanni) is a British mercenary with poison-tipped blades who is hired by Tobias Whale to bring Painkiller to him alive. Gambi claims that Cutter is rumored to have a telekinetic ability. During the riots caused by the 100, Cutter sees that Tobias is starting to lose it and takes her leave.

Todd Green
Todd Green (portrayed by RJ Cyler) – A man who loses his research grant to a white wards board and is swayed to Tobias Whale's side by wiring $100,000.00 to Todd's account. After cracking the code in the briefcase, Todd and Tobias discovered that the A.S.A. was developing metahumans for Project Masters of Disaster. In addition, he orchestrates the secret jailbreak of Helga Jace. Tobias Whale later has Cutter use a car bomb on Todd Green when he served his purpose. His glasses were salvaged by the police as Henderson has it placed in evidence.

Introduced in season three

Jamillah Olson
Jamillah Olson (portrayed by Adetinpo Thomas) is a reporter for Clap Back that broadcasts on the A.S.A.'s occupation of Freeland. After Truthteller Johnson was fished out of the river, Henderson recruits her to be the new voice of the resistance against the A.S.A. During the Markovian invasion of Freeland, Jamillah was shot by a Markovian soldier while broadcasting about the attack.

Shonda
Shonda (voiced by Sh'Kia Augustin) is the AI in Anissa's apartment who was created by Gambi.

Devonte Jones
Devonte Jones (portrayed by Rafael Castillo) – A man who was briefly in A.S.A. custody for being a suspected metahuman. After he was released, he sided with Lala and helped to investigate the Ultimate O business run by Lady Eve. Devonte later assisted Lala in torturing Dr. Matthew Blair on where Tobias Whale is by beating him up. Devonte later assists Lala and the remnants of the 100 in fighting the Markovian soldiers.

Yuri Mosin
Yuri Mosin (portrayed by Thomas K. Belgry) is a Markovian colonel and old enemy of Agent Odell that leads the attack on Freeland. He and Instant later sneak into Freeland to steal some A.S.A. information. Due to an ambush led by Agent Odell, Yuri Mosin and Instant started a shootout which led to Odell getting wounded. Before Mosin can finish off Odell, Black Lightning shows up causing Instant to teleport Mosin away. At the Markovians' base, Mosin was not pleased that Instant didn't let him finish off Odell or Black Lightning. Instant reminds him that he hired him to get him into Freeland. After Instant leaves upon Mosin wiring the money to his account, Jace states that Lynn has found a way to stabilize the meta-gene as they will obtain the information so that they can stabilize the metahumans on the Markovians' side. Gravedigger later appeared at the facility where he had received orders from his superiors to take over the operation from Mosin. Using a 20-minute Green Light that has Gravedigger's DNA in it, she mind-controlled Mosin to stand still and placed the shock device on her neck onto his neck. Once she had gotten to a safer distance with Lightning, Lynn had Mosin shock himself until he passes out. When Mosin states to Gravedigger that his men can't find Tobias, Gravedigger thanks him for his services to Markovia and uses his upgraded powers to kill him.

Brandon Marshall

Brandon Marshall (portrayed by Jahking Guillory) is a new student at Garfield High. At the time when A.S.A. soldiers were giving a beat-down to Jefferson Pierce, Jennifer discovers that he is a metahuman who can manipulate the properties of earth as seen when he makes Jennifer some diamonds from some coal as well as negating electrical attacks. Brandon revealed to Jennifer that he came to Markovia to look for Helga Jace who was responsible for killing his mother. Because his mother died when he was young, Brandon had been in different foster homes. After an earthquake-triggering seizure that Jennifer treated, Brandon and Jennifer are captured by Sergeant Grayle and Specialist Travis. Both of them managed to escape partially due to a combination of Jennifer overloading the inhibitor collars and Sergeant Grayle knocking out Specialist Travis. Brandon later meets Jefferson when Jennifer informs him on how Odell used her. Jennifer later persuades her father to let him assist in rescuing Lynn partially by revealing his abilities and partially because he is looking for Helga Jace. When it came to rescuing Lynn from the Markovians, Brandon used his earthquake when he finally encounters Jace only to be knocked out by Sergeant Grayle who evacuated both of them. Jennifer brought Brandon to Dr. Jace to get information on her mother whose ashes he kept in crystallized form. She stated that she was killed by his father who also had earth-based forms. Brandon throws the crystallized ash into Dr. Jace's left shoulder and leaves with Jennifer. He asks TC to help look for information on his father only for Khalil to suffer a glitch that briefly frees the Painkiller program. Brandon later held Dr. Jace at his apartment so that she can tell him all about his father. When Lightning gets captured, Brandon helps Black Lightning to rescue her. He and Lightning briefly fight Gravedigger in the Pit, after which the two of them kiss.

Sara Grey
Sara Grey (portrayed by Katy O'Brian) is an A.S.A. commando under the rank of major who works with Agent Odell to enforce the curfew in Freeland and obtain any suspected metahumans. She was among the commandos rescued from the Markovians by Black Lightning. When Odell was wounded in an A.S.A. shootout with Yuri Mosin and Instant, Sara Grey becomes the acting director of operations. After recuperating from Black Lightning's attack, Sara Grey worked on weaponizing the metahumans that the A.S.A. has. To bring Jennifer to Odell, she pairs Sergeant Grayle up with Specialist Travis. When Black Lightning intercepted Odell's convoy, Sara Grey sends Painkiller and some A.S.A. commandos to rescue him. After Lynn was taken to Markovia by Instant, Sara Grey and Black Lightning have a parley where they agree that Lynn must be rescued. As a contingency, Grey has Dr. Blair put a kill Lynn contingency in Erica Moran's chip in the event that Lynn is beyond rescuing. She also meets Peter Gambi who she researched about. While she was not pleased that Tobias got away, Grey is dismissed by Odell. During the Markovian invasion of Freeland, Sara Grey was instructed by Odell to find the briefcase or destroy it. After a meeting with Lady Eve which resulted in a shootout, Major Grey and her soldiers attacked Gambi's tailor shop. While most of her men were killed by Gambi, she was killed by T.C.

Michael Allen
Michael Allen (portrayed by Euseph Messiah) is an A.S.A. nurse who assists Lynn with working on Tobias Whale. He is later revealed to be a double agent working for the Markovians upon Lynn's capture. When in Markovia, Allen continues to extract some bone marrow samples from Tobias. Tobias later visits Michael's house where he killed Michael's father and spared his mother. He wants Michael to take him to where the metahumans in the Markovians' possession are.

Gardner Grayle

Gardner Grayle (portrayed by Boone Platt) is an A.S.A. commando under the rank of sergeant. He assisted Sara Grey in pulling suspected metahumans out of houses. When the Pit was going under lockdown, Grayle allowed Lynn to get buy him. Grey paired Grayle up with Specialist Travis to bring Jennifer to Odell. During this time, he noticed that Specialist Travis has a chip in his neck. As Jennifer engaged Specialist Travis, Grayle knocked him out enabling Jennifer and Brandon to get away. After helping Lynn sneak Tobias Whale out of the Pit, they get tasered by a Markovian operative. With Lynn in the Markovians' clutches, Grayle informs Jefferson about it as Jefferson has him arrange a parley with Major Grey. When it comes to their invasion of the Markovian facility, Grayle informed Jefferson that Major Grey had Erica Moran chipped only for TC to state that he deactivated the chip when he got suspicious of it. Upon Brandon finding Jace and starting to cause an earthquake, Grayle knocked him out and had both of them evacuated. During the Markovian invasion of Freeland, Grayle and Erica assist in the evacuation of the suspected metahumans. When they and the rebels try to fight Gravedigger, he just mind-controls them to sleep.

Erica Moran
Erica Moran (portrayed by Gabriella Garcia) is a kinetic energy-absorbing metahuman in the A.S.A.'s custody who is a genderbent version of the DC Comics character Freight Train. In Lynn's dream sequence, she explodes before she can release the absorbed energy. Erica starts to improve her abilities with Lynn's help. When Lynn has been abducted by the Markovians, Erica was chipped by the A.S.A. to assist in the upcoming raid on Markovia. Major Grey has Dr. Blair place a kill Lynn contingency in Erica's chip in the event that Lynn can't be saved. Though that chip was secretly deactivated by TC when he got close to Erica. He revealed that information to Jefferon Pierce and Gardner Grayle. When it came to the raid on the Markovian facility, Thunder had to strike Erica until she had enough kinetic energy to knock down a strong door. After the mission was done, it was mentioned by Odell to Jefferson that Erica has been returned to her family. Prior to attending Anissa and Grace's engagement party, Erica does managed to kiss TC before the Markovians can begin their invasion of Freeland. During the Markovian invasion on Freeland, Erica assists Grayle in the evacuation of the suspected metahumans. When they and the rebels tried to fight Gravedigger, he mind-controls them to sleep.

Matthew Blair
Dr. Matthew Blair (portrayed by Brandon Hirsch) is a young scientist who assists Lynn in her work with the metahumans in A.S.A. custody. After Lynn flees, Dr. Blair is left to work on the vaccine where he has only been able to reach 60%. Major Grey later has Dr. Blair place a kill Lynn contingency in Erica's chip in the event that Lynn can't be saved. Dr. Blair was later abducted by Lala and tortured by Devonte on where Tobias Whale is which he has no knowledge of.

T.C. / Baron

T.C. (portrayed by Christopher Ammanuel) is a pod metahuman with technopathic abilities. Due to him hearing a lot of current technology speaking after being freed, Baron took residence at an old radio station where he met Peter Gambi and assisted him and Thunder in getting Jamillah's message to outside of Freeland. Baron later found himself at Gambi's tailor shop where he found Gambi's secret room and his connections with Black Lightning, Thunder, and Lightning. When Baron goes onto Gambi's computers to find information on who tried to have Gambi killed, he has a brief collapse as the image on the monitor shows a picture of Lady Eve. He later meets Jefferson and translates Painkiller's technology. With help from Gambi and Jennifer, TC created a firewall to trap the Painkiller programming enabling Khalil to regain control of his body. Upon getting suspicious of what has been placed on Erica, TC deactivated the chip that contained the programmed contingency plan which he later revealed to Black Lightning and Gardner Grayle. After checking to see if Painkiller is still behind the firewall, TC was approached by Brandon to look up information on his father only for Khalil to suffer a glitch that briefly freed Painkiller. Following the incident, TC helps Gambi open the briefcase that Lady Eve gave him after she got it from Lala. Prior to the Markovians' invasion of Freeland, TC manages to get a kiss from Erica. During the Markovian invasion, he helped Gambi coordinate Black Lightning in rescuing Lightning and warning them that the Pit was set to self-destruct.

In season four, T.C. helps Jefferson track down Lydell Green after he accidentally shot Marcel Payton's son during the 100's shootout with the Kobra Cartel. T.C. also helps to analyze the DEG, track down Terry Andrews for Lightning, and advises Lightning to take caution with what she posts on social media. After Lightning exploded, T.C. and Gambi work on a machine to put her back together. While helping Jennifer to adjust to her new body, T.C. is among those that find out that Val Seong has power-negating abilities when Lynn tests a meta-booster with Val's DNA in it on Gambi. During a transmission with Khalil and Philky, T.C. works on helping to subdue Painkiller while mentioning his suspicion that Tobias Whale framed Jefferson for embezzlement. Following the death of Tobias Whale, T.C. helps Khalil and Painkiller get rid of the kill code at the cost of Khalil's memories of the Pierce family. Gambi later passes his torch to T.C.

Destiny
Destiny (portrayed by Teesha Renee) is a worker at the Ultimate O who works for Lady Eve.

In season four, Destiny becomes the underboss for the Kobra Cartel. Following the death of Mayor Billy Black, Destiny contacts Lala for a truce stating that the police will come after the Kobra Cartel once they are done with the 100. After witnessing Lala revive upon being shot and the arrest of the 100 members present, Destiny calls up someone stating that they need to find an assassin who specializes in metahumans. This leads to her calling in Ishmael who successfully stabs Lala and traps his body in cement casket. Destiny displayed it in her hideout as she learns that Ishmael is planning to kill 100 metahumans in order to get into the League of Assassins. As Ishmael already killed 94 metahumans, Destiny contracts him to kill Black Lightning and his allies.

Gravedigger / Tyson Sykes

Tyson Sykes (portrayed by Wayne Brady) is a World War II soldier and half-brother of Jefferson Pierce's grandfather Ben who became a subject to a metahuman project collaboration between the United States and Markovia in exchange for not being court martialed for beating up some soldiers that used racist remarks on him. Tyson was the only survivor of this project. While he possesses super-strength, super-speed, and mind-control, Gravedigger maintained his age due to the same serum that Helga Jace used on Tobias Whale. He used his talents when fighting Nazi soldiers. Afrer the war, Gravedigger sided with Markovia, assisted in a coup d'état, and became one of the Markovian's few stable metahumans who plans to make an independent metahuman nation in Markovia. Gravedigger even considered Martin Luther King Jr. a coward and claimed that the rich white people helped to get Barack Obama elected. Years later, Gravedigger was sent by his superiors to take over the operation from Mosin where he used his mind-control to get Lynn Stewart to work on the metahuman stabilization faster. In one instance, Lynn had to ask for his DNA sample which she secretly used for her 20-minute Green Light. When Black Lightning and his allies raided the Markovian facility to rescue Lynn, Tobias, and Jace, Gravedigger overpowered Khalil and used his laser gun to knock out Black Lightning. Then he used his mental abilities to stop the group from evacuating. Lynn started to surrender to Gravedigger due to him being immune to other mind-control attacks only for Black Lightning to catch up to them and shock Gravedigger into submission. A Markovian scientist later injected Gravedigger with the meta-boost formula that Lynn left behind. When Mosin comes in stating that his men can't find Tobias, Gravedigger states to Mosin that Markovia thanks him for his services and uses his upgraded powers to kill Mosin. After researching those who rescued Lynn, Gravedigger leads the invasion on Freeland. Lynn found that Jefferson's DNA and Gravedigger's DNA are a match meaning that they are related. Lightning takes out the ones who were with Gravedigger before fighting Gravedigger. He resists the electrical attacks and throws Lightning against the perimeter enough to take it down. Black Lightning resuscitates Lightning just as Gravedigger catches up to them. Black Lightning begins to fight him. He did use a microwave ability on Black Lightning before he made a tactical retreat when the Markovian soldiers made off with Lightning. Lightning even tried to reason with him. During Gravedigger's raid on the Pit, he mind-controlled those on the outside to sleep, mind-controlled Grace into attacking Thunder, and knocked down Lightning and Brandon. Gravedigger fought Black Lightning again. After being hit by the anti-boost serum shot by Lynn, Black Lightning defeated Gravedigger. Using a cloaking technology upon surviving the Pit's self-destruct sequence, Gravedigger watched Black Lightning's meeting with a congressional committee that exposed the A.S.A.'s experiments as well as Markovia's own experiments. Upon leaving the building, Gravedigger sheds his disguise and walks off with satisfaction that the racist cover-up which fueled his anger has been exposed.

Introduced in season four

Lauren Caruso
Lauren Caruso (portrayed by Elena Varela) is an employee at Monovista International and the ex-girlfriend of Gambi. During Gambi's early work with the A.S.A., Lauren turned down his offer to join with them. After meeting up with Gambi years later, Lauren and the rest of Monovista International start to work on the DEGs.

Hassan Shakur
Hassan Shakur (portrayed by Wallace Smith) is a detective in the Freeland Police Department that works close with Chief Lopez and had an earlier encounter with Black Lightning in his youth. Following the death of Mayor Billy Black, Lopez makes a reluctant Shakur the head of the Meta Task Force where he leads the arrest of the 100 members that were with Lala. Shakur was later present with the Meta Task Force when Lightning defeated Lopez.

Ana Lopez
Ana Lopez (portrayed by Melissa De Sousa) is a woman who is sworn in as the new chief of police of the Freeland Police Department. Following the death of Mayor Billy Black, Lopez starts the Meta Task Force while appointing Hassan Shakur as its leader. Consumed by her desires to defeat Lightning, Lopez uses the meta-booster that Tobias Whale gave her to gain electrokinesis where she starts to drain Freeland's power grid. She is defeated by Lightning.

Dr. Bowlan
Dr. Bowlan (portrayed by Bethann Hardison) is a therapist that Jefferson and Lynn see.

Red
Red (portrayed by Matt Roszak) is a man with magnetic abilities who becomes Tobias Whale's latest minion. He was the one who killed Mayor Billy Black with his special bullet that was later found by Hassan. Tobias later dispatched Red to find out from Marshall Bates on why a specific item has been delayed. Upon being informed that the device still needs to be fully tested, Red informs Bates to have that test finished up and en route to Tobias in 48 hours or else one of his bullets will go into his head. Red was unaware that the footage of the discussion was being watched by Jefferson and Gambi.

Val Seong
Val Seong (portrayed by Helen Joo Lee) is Tobias Whale's lawyer who has ALS and a meta-gene that grants her power-negating abilities.

Dr. Darius Morgan
Dr. Darius Morgan (portrayed by Todd Anthony) is a doctor that becomes Anissa's co-worker. He is also revealed to be an ordained minister where he weds Anissa and Grace. When Anissa later goes to his apartment to learn the information about the metahuman cure from him, she finds Darius dead in his apartment.

Marshall Bates
Marshall Bates (portrayed by Paden Fallis) is an executive at Monovista International.

Ishmael

Ishmael (portrayed by Rico Ball) is an assassin who is hired by Destiny to deal with Lala. After killing him and trapping his body in a cement casket, Ishmael states to Destiny that he is planning to kill 100 metahumans in order to get into the League of Assassins. As he had already killed 94 metahumans, Ishmael is further contracted by Destiny to go after Black Lightning and his allies. Though Tobias later pays him more money while intimidating Destinee to end the Kobra Cartel's gang war with the 100. After finding out what Painkiller did to Jesse Gentilucci, Tobias Whale sends Ishmael to take out Painkiller and Looker. Painkiller manages to kill Ishmael by getting his poison onto the hilt of Ishmael's sword.

Kevin Mason
Kevin Mason (portrayed by Jamal Akakpo) is a special agent for the FBI who investigates Jefferson for embezzlement. After having Lynn's work confiscated, Mason later arrests Lynn for violation of civil rights. It was discovered that Mason was being controlled by Looker after the information was found with her involvement with Tobias was discovered. With help from Detective Shakur, Jefferson slipped a chemical that Lynn made into the coffees for the interrogation which caused the silver liquid to be ejected from Mason. Jefferson then exposed Looker's control on him to Mason.

Guest stars

Introduced in season one
 Varetta Henderson (portrayed by Karen Ceesay) – The wife of Inspector Henderson and the mother of Kiesha Henderson.
 Will (portrayed by Dabier Snell) – A member of the 100 and cousin of Lala who kidnaps Anissa and Jennifer. He is later killed by Lala for disappointing him and later appears as a ghost that only Lala can see with his tattoo appearing on Lala.
 Lawanda White (portrayed by Tracey Bonner) – One of Jefferson's former students whose daughter was taken by the 100 under Lala's supervision. After Jefferson fails to help her as promised, Lawanda confronts Lala who shoots and kills her mercilessly. Unknown to him, she recorded the entire exchange, which leads to his arrest at the hands of Inspector Henderson and eventual death at the hands of Tobias Whale. Lawanda later turns up as a ghost that only Lala can see with her tattoo appearing on Lala.
 Tori Whale (portrayed by Edwina Findley) – Tobias Whale's younger sister who assists in his plot to destroy Black Lightning. She is accidentally killed by a stray bullet while trying to escape from Black Lightning.
 Eldridge Whale (portrayed by T. C. Carson) – The torturous father of Tobias and Tori. After being found by Tori, Tobias repays their father by breaking his spine and leaving him for dead.
 David Poe (portrayed by Antonio Fargas) – The editor-in-chief of the Freeland Gazette who gives Anissa files that once belonged to her grandfather Alvin. He is subsequently killed offscreen in a staged hit-and-run.
 Mr. Nasir (portrayed by Jigga) - A teacher at Garfield High.
 Chandler Tong (portrayed by Regina Chen) - A news anchor for WIXA 7 who reports on the activities in Freeland.
 Gordon (portrayed by Vanessa Aranegui) - A math teacher at Garfield High.
 Glennon (portrayed by Faron Salisbury) - A detective in the Freeland Police Department who was bribed by the A.S.A. through Kara Fowdy into doing their bidding like assisting Deputy Chief Cayman in planting evidence that Jefferson Pierce had Green Light. After Henderson found proof that the bribe that Glennon took was used to pay for a new house for his son, Glennon cooperated with Henderson which led to the arrest of Caymen and those involved.
 Steven Connors (portrayed by Joshua Mikel) – A drug supplier and an associate of Lala. He later allies with Tobias following attacks from Thunder.
 Thomas Hildago (portrayed by Morgan Brown) – A weapon maker who is allied with the A.S.A. After being interrogated by Gambi, Thomas is later killed offscreen by Lala.
 Alvin Pierce (portrayed by Keith Arthur Bolden) – The father of Jefferson and friend of Peter Gambi who worked as a reporter. He was killed by Tobias Whale after exposing him for corruption. Jefferson once conversed with him following a near-death experience the day when Tobias Whale raided Garfield High. In season four, Jefferson visits Henderson's grave and converses with his father's ghost.
 Josh Henry portrays an unnamed scientist working for the A.S.A. who oversees the stasis pods that the captured metahumans in Proctor's possession are in.
 Detective Sergeant King (portrayed by Crystal Lee Brown) – A member of the Freeland Police Department who started out as a desk sergeant and later become a detective sergeant. In Season 3, she was picked up by Carson Williams for being a suspected Green Light user. At the time when a virus that was harming the metahumans was occurring, Henderson visited King where she admitted taking Green Light when crime was worse. Before succumbing to the virus, King directed Henderson to a fake floor in her locker and advised her to give the contents of the envelope to her husband.
Tavon Singley (portrayed by Jasun Jabbar Wardlaw Jr.) – A student at Garfield High.  In season three, Tavon was a suspected metahuman despite his test showing that he doesn't have Green Light in him. He is later poisoned during an ambush on Blackbird by Painkiller and dies in Black Lightning's arms.

Roland S. Martin and Nina Turner appeared as themselves in the pilot. Journalist Amanda Davis has a posthumous cameo appearance in two episodes.

Introduced in season two
 Dr. Napier Frank (portrayed by Robert Townsend) – An old friend of Jefferson Pierce who is on Freeland's board of education.
 Marcel Payton (portrayed by Kedrick Brown) – A teacher at Garfield High. He was present when Jefferson Pierce stepped down as principal. In season three, Marcel taught one of his classes when Jennifer accidentally fried the computers. In season four, Marcel was revealed to have been left homeless since the Markovian invasion. After Lydell Green of the 100 accidentally killed his unnamed son during the 100's shootout with the Kobra Cartel, his other children were taken by child services and Marcel had to resign. Though he took back his resignation and Jefferson found that he had been taking part in Lala's cage fights. Jefferson was able to lend his old house to him until he is able to get his kids back from child services. Marcel later informs Jefferson that Tobias has gotten him a new house at the time when developers plan to put a new hospital where his old house is standing.
 Sekou Hamilton (portrayed by Christian Alex Jones) – A student at Garfield High who got into a fight with another student which Jefferson broke up. Mike Lowry had him expelled for starting the fight while the other student was suspended. Through unknown means in season three, Sekou was re-enrolled at Garfield High as he was seen among the students speaking out towards the A.S.A. soldiers for what happened to Tavon. He was attacked by an A.S.A. soldier before Jefferson intervened.
 Zoe B. (portrayed by Andy Allo) – A musician that Anissa befriends.
 Montez (portrayed by Salli Richardson-Whitfield) – The district attorney of Freeland.
 Anaya (portrayed by Birgundi Baker) – A pregnant girl that Anissa attends to at the clinic. Due to her romance with Deacon, she gave birth to twins with one being black and one being white. In Season 3, Anaya allows safe passage for the suspected metahumans through their territory. When the Markovians attacked South Freeland, Anaya sent a distress call to Anissa. It was later mentioned that Anaya and Thierry were captured and were later rescued.
 Deacon (portrayed by Rob Morean) – The boyfriend of Anaya. He later dies in front of Anissa where he then emits some metal-like substance in front of Anissa and Henderson. It was later revealed that Deacon was part of South Freeland's Sange community.
 Looker (portrayed by Sofia Vassilieva) – A metahuman that can control people with a metal-like substance she emits. She is the ruler of South Freeland's Sange community. During the fight between Black Lightning and Thunder at Freeland's clinic, Looker was defeated when Thunder threw her into a hook in the wall as Black Lightning plans to have her handed over to the A.S.A. Looker's defeat also freed the Sange from her control. In season four, Looker was revealed to have escaped A.S.A. custody during the Markovian invasion and began working for Tobias Whale who paid him to control Kevin Mason into accusing Jefferson Pierce of embezzlement. She was defeated by Painkiller where Khalil gave her half the antidote and persuaded her to confess her involvement with Tobias Whale to the Freeland Police Department. After Painkiller killed Ishmael, Looker was handed over to Detective Shakur and Kevin Mason.
 Sheriff Clark (portrayed by Robert Walker Branchaud) – The sheriff of South Freeland that works for Looker.
 Kwame Parker (portrayed by Eric Lynch) – A Freeland councilman and benefactor of Martin Proctor who is swayed to Tobias Whale's side. When Tobias Whale unleashed Heatstroke into Freeland, Parker was burned by Heatstroke.
 Thierry (portrayed by Warren "WAWA" Snipe) – The deaf father of Anaya and member of South Freeland's Perdi community. In Season 3, he and some Perdi find Anissa's Blackbird alias after she was blasted through the perimeter by an A.S.A. soldier. Thierry allows Blackbird safe passage through their woods. When the Markovians attacked South Freeland, it was mentioned that Anaya and Thierry were captured and were later rescued.
 Batina (portrayed by Charmin Lee) – The mother of Anaya and member of South Freeland's Perdi community who interprets for her husband Thierry. She is killed in battle with the Sange.
 Kito Payne (portrayed by Kendrick Cross) – The father of Khalil and husband of Nichelle who is an ex-criminal.
 Instant (portrayed by Tosin Morohunfola) – A teleporting metahuman and bounty hunter. After killing some people in a bar, Instant is contacted by an unknown client telling him to head to Freeland. When in Freeland, he kills some police officers to get to Helga Jace. As Jace notes his teleporting ability, Instant reveals that he was hired by the Markovians to reclaim Jace. Instant does that and teleports away with Jace before Henderson shows up. In Season 3, Yuri Mosin contracted Instant to sneak him into Freeland so that they can steal A.S.A. information. Due to Sara Grey detecting Instant's teleportation energy, Odell sets up an ambush while using technology to negate Instant's teleporting. This leads to a shootout where Odell gets wounded. Instant gets Mosin away when Black Lightning shows up. After reminding Mosin that he contracted him to get him into Freeland, Instant gets Mosin's payment wired to his account and he teleports away. A Markovian operative that tased Lynn and Gardner Grayle contacted Mosin to have Instant bring Lynn and Tobias Whale to Markovia.
 Masters of Disaster – A group of metahumans created by the A.S.A. as part of the experiments of "Project Masters of Disaster."
 Marcus Bishop / Shakedown (portrayed by Hosea Chanchez) – A secret A.S.A. operative who can generate vibrations and frequencies at will. He was released from his body by Tobias Whale to help Cutter steal some of the pods from the A.S.A. Shakedown is defeated by Black Lightning and Thunder.
 Joe / Heatstroke (portrayed by Esteban Cueto) – A pyrokinetic metahuman released by Tobias Whale to serve him. He was unleashed into Freeland where Tobias Whale broadcast his attack on the Dark Web to promote the metahuman arms race. During the Masters of Disaster's fight with Black Lightning and Thunder, Heatstroke is shot by Lala.
 Daryl Robinson / Coldsnap (portrayed by Derrick Lewis) – A cryokinetic metahuman released by Tobias Whale to serve him. He is defeated by Black Lighting and Thunder.
 Rebecca Jones / New Wave (portrayed by Brooke Ence) – An aquakinetic metahuman released by Tobias Whale to serve him. She serves as the leader of the Masters of Disaster. New Wave is defeated by Black Lightning and Thunder.
 Lazarus Prime (portrayed by Michael Wright) – A mysterious man and old friend of Lady Eve who puts Lala back together and revives him. He supports Lala's revenge plans on Tobias Whale for what he did to Lady Eve. It was revealed that he was also known by Agent Odell.

Benjamin Crump and Angela Rye appears as themselves in the season two premiere talking about the Green Light incident.

Introduced in season three
 Maryum Luqman (portrayed by Zoe Renee) – A Muslim metahuman with camouflage abilities. The side effect of her current health has been causing her to lose her hair, her fingernails falling out, and her eyes bleeding. The A.S.A. labeled her as "Chameleon."
 Carson Williams (portrayed by Christopher B. Duncan) – An A.S.A. Meta Force soldier under the rank of commander and metahuman who can copy the abilities of any metahuman that he comes in contact with. He works with Agent Odell to enforce the curfew in Freeland and obtain any suspected metahumans. When he had a showdown with Black Lightning at Franklin Terrace where he copied his powers, Williams understood the side-effects of this and collapses from the lack of insulation. Williams is then evacuated by the A.S.A. soldiers. Sara Grey later mentions to Odell that Williams is almost done recuperating. Odell later ordered Williams to remove all classified information. He was able to kill Dr. Jace. When he tried to kill Lynn, she briefly copied Erica's powers and kills Williams in self-defense.
 Cyclotronic / Ned Creegan (portrayed by Chase Alexander) – A metahuman who can disintegrate anything at will and was part of the same program that gave Carson Williams his powers according to Gambi's research. When Cyclotronic attacked the A.S.A. facility that Anissa and Reverend Holt were given a tour of, Carson Williams fought Cyclotronic and snapped his neck. It was suspected by Lynn that Cyclotronic was the carrier for a man-made virus that the Markovians used to infect the metahumans in the A.S.A.'s custody. This was confirmed by Jace when Lynn is in the Markovians' clutches when she needed Lynn to create the cure for the virus.
 Rebecca Larson (portrayed by Amanda Baker) - A news woman who is the host of the news show Larson Line. In season four, she slanders the metahuman community including Lightning.
 Sinzell Johnson (portrayed by Mac Wells) – A gangster who was exploiting the remnants of the 100 until he is driven away from Lala. He later leads different raids on the A.S.A. convoys for supplies and is poisoned by Painkiller.
 Herbert King (portrayed by Antwan Mills) – The husband of Detective Sergeant King. Following his wife's death, Herbert received an envelope of money from Henderson that his wife had saved for him. Henderson then drove off before Herbert can ask him something.
 Mary Louise Shepard (portrayed by Andrea Frye) – An old lady living at Franklin Terrace who was formerly a third-grade teacher of Jefferson and Henderson.
 Travis (portrayed by Garrett Hines) – An A.S.A. commando under the rank of specialist. After getting out of surgery, he was assigned by Sara Grey to assist Gardner Grayle in apprehending Jennifer. Once that was done, Grayle noticed that there is one of the A.S.A.'s control chips in the back of his neck. When Travis engaged Jennifer, the bullets he shot went through her. Grayle knocked Travis out enabling Jennifer and Brandon to get away.
 Representative Nagar (portrayed by Jennifer Christa Palmer) – The head of a Congressional committee that runs the hearing that had Black Lightning presenting the evidence that exposes the A.S.A.'s experiments as well as Markovia's own experiments. She states to Black Lightning, Lynn, Thunder, and Lightning that the A.S.A. will be disbanded and that Odell will be prosecuted.
 Judge Isabella (portrayed by Tony Isabella) – A judge on the Congressional committee.
 Judge Von Eeden (portrayed by Trevor Von Eeden) – A judge on the Congressional committee.

Introduced in season four
 Billy Black (portrayed by Reggie Hayes) - The Mayor of Freeland. He is responsible for swearing in Ana Lopez as the new chief of police. He was against Tobias Whale's offer to tear down Garfield High as he went there when he was young and his children are attending it. During an event in the neutral area that Blackbird established, Mayor Black was secretly killed by Red who made it look like that the 100 was responsible for his death which left Lopez convinced. Tobias had this done in retaliation for Mayor Black declining to have Garfield High torn down.
 Lydell Green (portrayed by Kelvin Hair) - A member of the 100 who was responsible for accidentally killing Marcel Payton's son during a shootout with the Kobra Cartel. This led to Black Lightning crippling him. Lala was not pleased with what happened and later killed Lydell during the confrontation causing Lydell's tattoo to manifest on the back of Lala's right hand. The police later found Lydell's body and Lopez suspected that Lightning was responsible.
 Terry Andrews (portrayed by Tre' Stokes) - A young man who filmed Lightning fighting the 100 and the Kobra Cartel which Rebecca Larson uses in her slandering of metahumans. When Lightning fights Terry with T.C.'s help, he asks for a selfie which she does and also leads to Lightning to start a social media page which Terry follows.
 Behemoth (portrayed by Nicholas Pulos) - A cage fighter that takes parts in Lala's illegal cage fights. He managed to beat up Marcel Payton in a cage match before being defeated by Jefferson Pierce.
 Wesley Robinson (portrayed by Troy Faruk) - The deputy chief of the Freeland Police Department. He is secretly allied with the 100.
 Philky (portrayed by Alexander Hodge) - A remnant of the A.S.A. who allies with Khalil and uses his part in Akashic Valley as a front for Khalil's activities.
 Donald (portrayed by James Roch) - A former Marines medic who allies with Khalil. He worked on healing Anissa when she was poisoned by Painkiller during Grace's abduction.
 Maya Odell (portrayed by Sibongile Mlambo) - The daughter of Percy Odell who operates in Akashic Valley.
 Uriah (portrayed by McKalin Hand) - A new student at Garfield High that befriends Jennifer in her J.J. alias.
 Jesse Gentilucci (portrayed by Kenneth Trujillo) - A gangster who is associated with Tobias Whale. Khalil visited his club in need of specific information. After taking out his men, Khalil and Painkiller do a good cop/bad cop technique on anything related to Tobias Whale framing Jefferson Pierce for embezzlement. Jesse writes for them the location of the hiddel ledger that would help Khalil. Afterwards, Jesse is poisoned by Painkiller. Tobias later found out about Jesse's death at the hands of Painkiller causing Tobias to enlist Ishmael to deal with Painkiller.
 Keith Michaels (portrayed by Will Blagrove) - A lawyer and Lynn's ex-boyfriend who Anissa enlists to defend Lynn when she was arrested for violation of civil rights.

Fantastic Negrito cameos as a hologram version of himself in Philky's bar.

References

Lists of Arrowverse characters
Black Lightning
Black Lightning
Black Lightning
Black Lightning (TV series)